Juan Manuel (1282–1349) was a nephew of King Alfonso X el Sabio

Juan Manuel may also refer to:

 Juan Manuel Rodríguez (1771–1847), Salvadoran revolutionary
 Juan Manuel de Rosas (1793–1877), Argentine governor
 Juan Manuel Fangio (1911–1995), Argentine racing driver
 Juan Manuel Santos (born 1951), Former president of Colombia
 Juan Manuel Fangio II (born 1956), Argentine racecar driver
 Juan Manuel Márquez (born 1973), Mexican professional boxer
 Juan Manuel Mendoza (born 1980), Colombian television actor
 Juan Manuel Correa (born 1999), Ecuadorian racing driver
 Juan Manuel (album), the second album by Plastilina Mosh

See also

João Manuel (disambiguation)